Zsuzsa Bánk (born 24 October 1965, in Frankfurt am Main) is a German writer.

Her parents moved to Germany after the Hungarian revolution of 1956 and she studied journalism, political science, and literature at the Johannes Gutenberg University Mainz and in Washington, D.C.

She has received several literature awards, such as the 2002 Aspekte-Literaturpreis given to the best debut novel written in German and the 2004 Adelbert von Chamisso Prize.
She lives in Frankfurt am Main with her husband and two children.

Works

External links

References 

1965 births
Living people
Writers from Frankfurt
21st-century German novelists
21st-century German women writers
German people of Hungarian descent
Johannes Gutenberg University Mainz alumni
German women novelists
German women short story writers
German short story writers
21st-century short story writers